Carol Lawrence-Beswick is a Jamaican jurist. She currently serves as the senior puisne judge of the Supreme Court of Jamaica.

Born Carol Lawrence, Lawrence-Beswick is a 1973 graduate of Hollins University. In 1977 she completed an LLB at the University of the West Indies. For a time she served as Jamaica's assistant director of public prosecutors. In 2001 she was appointed to the Supreme Court of Jamaica; in 2014 she was one of five women to be appointed to the Court of Appeal. For her service she has received the Distinguished Alumnae Award from Hollins University. Lawrence-Beswick was married to attorney Paul Beswick until his passing in 2021. Their daughter, Wendy Beswick, is a lawyer as well.

References

Year of birth missing (living people)
Living people
20th-century Jamaican lawyers
21st-century Jamaican judges
Hollins University alumni
University of the West Indies alumni
21st-century women judges
Jamaican women judges